Miss Rio Grande do Sul is a Brazilian Beauty pageant which selects the representative for the State of Rio Grande do Sul at the Miss Brazil contest. The pageant was created in 1954 and has been held every year since with the exception of 1990, 1993, and 2020. The pageant is held annually with representation of several municipalities. Since 2017, Marcelo Sóes has been the state director of Miss Rio Grande do Sul. Rio Grande do Sul is the state with the most crowns in the national contest and also the state that produced the first Miss Brazil to win the Miss Universe contest, Iêda Maria Vargas of Porto Alegre.

The following women from who competed as Miss Rio Grande do Sul have won Miss Brazil:

Maria José Cardoso, from Porto Alegre, in 1956
Iêda Maria Vargas, from Porto Alegre, in 1963
Rejane Vieira Costa, from Pelotas, in 1972
Deise Nunes, from Canela, in 1986
Leila Schüster, from Cachoeirinha, in 1993 
Renata Fan, from Santo Ângelo, in 1999
Juliana Borges, from Santa Maria, in 2001
Joseane Oliveira, from Esteio, in 2002 but was later dethroned
Fabiane Niclotti, from Gramado, in 2004
Rafaela Zanella, from Santa Maria, in 2006
Natálya Anderle, from Encantado, in 2008
Priscila Machado, from Farroupilha, in 2011
Gabriela Markus, from Teutônia, in 2012
Marthina Brandt, from Bom Princípio, in 2015
Julia Gama, from Porto Alegre, in 2020

Gallery of Titleholders

Results Summary

Placements
Miss Brazil:  (1956); Iêda Maria Vargas (1963);  (1972);  (1986);  (1993);  (1999);  (2001); Joseane Oliveira (2002; Dethroned); Fabiane Niclotti (2004); Rafaela Zanella (2006); Natálya Anderle (2008); Priscila Machado (2011); Gabriela Markus (2012); Marthina Brandt (2015); Julia Gama (2020)
1st Runner-Up:  (1961);  (1974); Madalena Sbaraini (1977); Gisselle Wëber (1991); Carolina Prates (2007); Juliana Mueller (2017)
2nd Runner-Up: Lígia Carotenuto (1954); Sandra Hervé (1957); Ana Cristina Rodrigues (1969); Rejane Hëiden (1983); Ceres Sessim (1989); Cátia Kupssinskü (1991); Luize Altenhofen (1998); Fernanda Schiavo (2000)
3rd Runner-Up:  (1970); Denise Cezimbra (1973); Adriana Zselinsky (1980);  (1987)
4th Runner-Up: Edda Logges (1960); Eva Arismende (1962); Christianne Wellausen (1984); Andréa Zambrano (1985); Alina Furtado (2022)
Top 5/Top 8/Top 9: Rosa Maria Gallas (1964); Clara Gröhmann (1966);  (1976); Bianca Scheren (2019)
Top 10/Top 12: Sílvia Porciúncula (1978); Marlene Petterle (1979); Patrícia Silveira (1982); Denise Schmitz (1988); Juliana Wülfing (1992); Tatiane Possebom (1994); Karine Baüer (1996); Juliana Lopes (2003); Eunice Pratti (2005); Bruna Felisberto (2009); Bruna Jaroceski (2010); Vitória Sulczinski (2013); Marina Helms (2014); Letícia Kuhn (2016)
Top 15/Top 16: Leonora Weimer (2018); Suellyn Scheffer (2021)

Special Awards
Best State Costume: Iêda Maria Vargas (1963)
Miss Congeniality:  (1961);  (1976)
Miss Photogenic:  (1999)
Miss Popular Vote: Fabiane Niclotti (2004)

Titleholders

Table Notes

References

External links
Official Miss Brasil Website

Women in Brazil
Rio Grande do Sul
Miss Brazil state pageants